Manoj Joshi (born 30 July 1965) is an Indian sports journalist, author and TV commentator. He has covered several Olympics, Asian Games, Commonwealth Games, South Asian Games and Afro Asian Games. He is known for his live commentary on 4 seasons of Pro Wrestling League on Sony Network and Big Bout League on Star Sports.

Career 
Manoj holds a MA (Hindi) from the Hindu College. He also has a Masters in Mass Communication from Guru Jambheshwar University. He holds a Post-graduate Diploma in Journalism and Mass Communication from the Indira Gandhi National Open University. Manoj started his career with Navbharat Times for 19 years in Mumbai and Delhi between April 1988 to January 2008, and later moved to TV and Digital Media. He has written several articles on newspapers and online prints. He currently serves as the Digital Sports Head for ITV network group. He is also a regular contributor to The Daily Guardian & Aaj Samaj. In 2005, he was invited as a guest for sportline programme of ESPN-Star Sports in Singapore. He has 550 hours of live wrestling commentary was recognized by Limca Book of Records in 2021. Manoj has also featured on Amir Khan's movie Dangal.

He is based in Indirapuram, Ghaziabad.

Bibliography 
 Joshi, Manoj (1992). Bhartiya Mall Vidya. Pushpang Prakashan, was awarded by Maharashtra Government & released by Sh. Sharad Pawar at Sangli (Maharashtra) in 1992
 Joshi, Manoj (1992).Indira Gandhi Gold Cup Hockey Tournament by Marine Sports, Mumbai & released by Smt. Sonia Gandhi at National Stadium, New Delhi.
 Joshi, Manoj (2004) Wrestling Rules.
 Joshi, Manoj (2007) Bharat ke Dus Shirshasth Pahelwan
 Joshi, Manoj (2018) Climax (on top 50 bouts of Pro Wrestling League) was released at Ludhiana

References

External links 

 Manoj Joshi on Twitter

Living people
Indian journalists
Indian writers
Wrestling
Sports journalists
Commentators
1965 births